Anthony Hamilton (born 18 February 1969 in Aylesbury, Buckinghamshire) is a former British Paralympic athlete who represented the United Kingdom at the 1988 and 1992 Paralympic games. He was the winner of two gold medals in the 800m and 1500m in the B3 category at the 1988 games, where he broke the world record for the fastest time over 1500m.

In 1992 in Barcelona he won the bronze in the 1500m B3. Hamilton is partially sighted and boarded at Exhall Grange School near Coventry. He was still at school when he first represented his country. Away from athletics he trained as a teacher, and has taught geography at schools around the Midlands. Hamilton was seconded to Birmingham Local Authority to support schools in an Ofsted category before becoming headmaster of George Dixon Academy for the period of 2009–2021.

References

External links
Coventry 2012: Hall of Fame

1969 births
Living people
Sportspeople from Aylesbury
Visually impaired middle-distance runners
English people with disabilities
British disabled sportspeople
English male middle-distance runners
Sportsmen with disabilities
Paralympic athletes of Great Britain
Paralympic gold medalists for Great Britain
Paralympic bronze medalists for Great Britain
Athletes (track and field) at the 1988 Summer Paralympics
Athletes (track and field) at the 1992 Summer Paralympics
Medalists at the 1988 Summer Paralympics
Medalists at the 1992 Summer Paralympics
People educated at Exhall Grange School
Paralympic medalists in athletics (track and field)
Paralympic middle-distance runners